Vindonissa (from a Gaulish toponym in  *windo- "white") was a Roman legion camp, vicus and later a bishop's seat at modern Windisch, Switzerland. The remains of the camp are listed as a heritage site of national significance.  The city of Brugg hosts a small Roman museum, displaying finds from the legion camp.

History
Excavations along the western edge of the Roman camp have discovered a few funeral pyre graves dating to the late Bronze Age ( 1000–800 BC). The first settlement of Vindonissa was a 1st century BC Helvetii fortified village on the peninsula between the Aare and Reuss rivers. The settlement came under Roman control either after the 58 BC conquest of the Helvetii by Julius Caesar or the 15 BC conquest of the Alps.

A small guard post was established on the site around 15 BC. The Roman settlement and legion camp was probably established in 15 AD. In an expansion around 30, thermal baths were added.
The Legio XIII Gemina was stationed at Vindonissa until 44 or 45. With the arrival of the 21st legion (XXI Rapax) the camp was rebuilt with stone fortifications. After the 21st legion had looted the countryside in 69, it was replaced by the 11th legion (XI Claudia) which remained stationed until 101. After this date, Vindonissa was a civilian settlement, with a castle built in the 4th century.

The first systematic excavation of the ruins began in 1896. This and later excavations discovered the ruins of several buildings and numerous artifacts. Vindonissa included the largest Roman amphitheater in modern Switzerland with seats for about 10,000. The foundations of the west and north walls and the remains of a Roman bath have been discovered.

See also
 Early history of Switzerland
 Etymology of Vindonissa

References

External links

Cultural property of national significance in Aargau
10s establishments
Coloniae (Roman)
Roman fortifications in Raetia
10s establishments in the Roman Empire
Roman fortified camps in Switzerland